The Sansepolcro Deposition or Sansepolcro Lamentation is a 1528 oil on canvas painting by Rosso Fiorentino, now in San Lorenzo church in Sansepolcro.

It was commissioned in 23 September 1527 by the Confraternity of the Holy Cross (hence its subject) for its altar in Santa Croce church in Sansepolcro. Rosso had arrived in the town shortly before this date.

Bibliography (in Italian)
A. Brilli – F. Chieli, Sansepolcro e i suoi musei, Arti Grafiche Motta, Milano 2004, pp. 32–36. 
 Antonio Natali, Rosso Fiorentino, Silvana Editore, Milano 2006. 
 Elisabetta Marchetti Letta, Pontormo, Rosso Fiorentino, Scala, Firenze 1994. 

1528 paintings
Paintings by Rosso Fiorentino
Fiorentino
Paintings in Sansepolcro
Oil on canvas paintings